Countess Vilma Hugonnai de Szentgyörgy (30 September 1847 in Nagytétény, Hungary (today part of Budapest) – 25 March 1922 in Budapest) was the first Hungarian woman medical doctor.

Life 
Countess Vilma Hugonnai was the fifth child of Count Kálmán Hugonnai and Riza Pánczély. She studied Medicine in Zürich and received her degree in 1879. When Vilma returned to Hungary she could not begin her career as a physician as the Hungarian administration refused to recognize her qualifications because of her gender. She worked as a midwife until 1897, when the Hungarian authorities accepted her degree and she could start her own medical practice. The first woman to qualify in Hungary was Sarolta Steinberger in 1900. Neither of them was allowed to practice without a male doctor's supervision until 1913.

Honors 
Asteroid 287693 Hugonnaivilma, discovered by Hungarian astronomers Krisztián Sárneczky and Brigitta Sipőcz at Piszkéstető Station in 2003, was named in her memory. The official  was published by the Minor Planet Center on 29 August 2015.

References 
 

1847 births
1922 deaths
Hungarian women physicians
Hungarian midwives
Physicians from Budapest
19th-century Hungarian people
20th-century Hungarian people
19th-century Hungarian physicians
20th-century Hungarian physicians
20th-century Hungarian women
19th-century Hungarian women
20th-century women physicians
19th-century women physicians